Brookula bohni is a species of sea snail, a marine gastropod mollusk, unassigned in the superfamily Seguenzioidea.

Description
The size of the shell varies between 0.95 mm and 1.3 mm.

Distribution
This marine species occurs off South Shetland Islands and in the Weddell Sea, Antarctica, found at depths between 3683 m and 3959 m

References

 Schwabe E. & Engl W. (2008). Description of two new deep-water species of the genus Brookula Iredale, 1912 (Mollusca, Gastropoda, Trochoidea), with a revision of the genus for the Subantarctic and Arctic Sector of the Atlantic Ocean. Zootaxa, 1866: 187–204
 Engl W. (2012) Shells of Antarctica. Hackenheim: Conchbooks. 402 pp

bohni
Gastropods described in 2008